Renaissance Man may refer to:

 Polymath, a person in the archetype of the High Renaissance of broad talents and expertise
 Renaissance Man (film), a 1994 comedy-drama film
 "Renaissance Man" (Star Trek: Voyager), the penultimate episode of the TV series Star Trek: Voyager
 Renaissance Man (album), a 2011 album by Jaimoe's Jasssz Band 
 The Renaissance Man, an audio drama